Bishop James Aitken (1613–1687) was a 17th-century Scottish prelate.

Life

He was born in 1613 in Kirkwall, Orkney, the son of Henry Aitken, commissary and sheriff of Orkney and Shetland, and his wife, Elizabeth Buchanan.

After his school days at Kirkwall Grammar School, he attended the University of Edinburgh, graduating on 23 July 1636, with an MA. Subsequently, he travelled to England to study divinity at the University of Oxford. Returning to Scotland as the chaplain of James, Marquess of Hamilton, he was given charge of the churches of Harray and Birsay on 27 June 1641.

Aitken remained staunch royalist during the English Civil War, and after the failure in 1650 of the campaign of James Graham, 1st Marquess of Montrose, fled to the Netherlands. He returned to Scotland during the Cromwellian Protectorate and resided in Edinburgh for most of the period between 1653 and 1660, moving his family from Orkney. With the Restoration of the latter year and the return of the monarchy, Aitken's known loyalty to the crown was rewarded with patronage. This began with a cash payment in May 1661, and later in that year, the church of Winfrith in Dorset.

After about 16 years in England, in June 1676 Aitken was elevated to the position of Bishop of Moray, receiving consecration two years later, on 28 October 1679. His brief period as Bishop of Moray came to an end when, on 6 February 1680, he was translated to the diocese of Galloway. As Bishop of Galloway, he received permission to reside in Edinburgh because, in the words of Robert Keith, "it was thought unreasonable to oblige a reverend prelate of his years to live among such a rebellious and turbulent people" He died on 15 November 1687, and was buried in Greyfriars Church, Edinburgh. The cause of death was apoplexy. John Hamilton, Bishop of Dunkeld, carried out his funeral eulogy.

Notes

References
Keith, Robert, An Historical Catalogue of the Scottish Bishops: Down to the Year 1688, (London, 1924), pp. 153–4, 282-3
Wayne Pearce, A. S., "Aitken , James (1612/13–1687)", in the Oxford Dictionary of National Biography, Oxford University Press, 2004 retrieved 3 May 2007

1610s births
1687 deaths
Alumni of Exeter College, Oxford
Alumni of the University of Edinburgh
Bishops of Galloway (Church of Scotland)
Bishops of Moray
People from Kirkwall
Burials at Greyfriars Kirkyard
Members of the Convention of the Estates of Scotland 1678
Members of the Parliament of Scotland 1681–1682
Members of the Parliament of Scotland 1685–1686
Scottish Restoration bishops